Cramlington Aerodrome was a military airfield established in Northumberland during the First World War. It became a civil airfield serving the Tyneside area of north-east England and operated until 1935, when it was replaced by Woolsington Airport, now known as Newcastle International Airport.

History

Military

In response to German Zeppelin airship raids over the industrially vital Tyneside area in 1915, a flight of three Royal Flying Corps (RFC) B.E.2c fighters were based at a field near Cramlington in late November to defend against further raids. The aircraft arrived on 1 December 1915 and were housed in canvas hangars. The site was chosen as it was higher and thus less prone to fog than local coastal locations.

The British Army and Royal Navy at first debated who should operate the field, with the army winning, and on 1 February 1916 No. 36 (Home Defence) Squadron was officially formed and three hangars were built. The airfield officially became RFC Cramlington, the first RFC airfield in the north-east of England. Extensive wooden buildings were constructed for offices, stores and accommodation, mostly on the far side of the road that ran down the east side of the airfield, which was also bordered to the north by a railway line.

Training became an important function at the airfield. It was used by Reserve Squadrons 47, 52 and 61, as well as 75 Training Squadron, later renamed to 52 Training Depot Station.

Operations continued at high intensity throughout the rest of the war, and a  radio transmitter mast was erected to enable information and instructions to be sent to pilots from the ground."Davis Aerodrome" /> When the RFC became the Royal Air Force on 1 April 1918 the airfield became RAF Cramlington.

In April 1918, the first flight of the Armstrong Whitworth F.M.4 Armadillo fighter took place at Cramlington because their normal field, at Town Moor Aerodrome in Newcastle, was surrounded by obstructions and too rough. The aircraft was not a success.

Further land was requisitioned for the construction of a larger hangar, the building of which extended into 1919. However the RAF had no further plans for the airfield, and it was reduced to Care and Maintenance status on 22 January 1920, and the RAF left completely in March.

Units
Major units based at Cramlington (in date order)
 36 Sqn Formed at Cramlington on 1 February 1916, moved to Newcastle 12 October 1916
 58 Sqn Formed Cramlington 8 June 1916, to Dover 17 December 1917
 76 Sqn Formed Cramlington 15 September 1916, to Ripon 10 October 1916
 63 Sqn From Stirling 31 October 1916, to Middle East June 1917
 120 Sqn Formed Cramlington 1 January 1918, to Bracebridge Heath 3 August 1918
 252 Sqn Based Tynemouth, detachment to Cramlington May 1918, to Killingholme 31 January 1919

Civil

In the early 1920s the airfield, then known as "Cramlington Aerodrome", or sometimes "Newcastle Airport", saw little use, and the buildings received  little maintenance. However in July 1925 The Newcastle upon Tyne Light Aeroplane Club, later renamed the Newcastle on Tyne Aero Club, was formed. It was commonly called the "Newcastle Aero Club". The members funded the building of a new hangar and with a grant from the Air Ministry bought two de Havilland DH.60 Cirrus Moths, G-EBLX, named 'Novocastria', and G-EBLY, named 'Bernicia', soon followed by two more. The club remained a loyal Moth operator with at least another six acquired over the following years.

A small company named Pleasure Flying Services Ltd. operated pleasure flights from early 1929 using Avro 548 G-EBPO, which they acquired from the Aero Club. It was a three-seat conversion of the two-seat Avro 504. Later that year they expanded, acquiring Simmonds Spartan two-seater G-AAGV and three-seater G-AAHV. 'GV crashed in September 1930 and was rebuilt as a three-seater re-registered as G-ABXO.

One of the earliest pupils of the Aero Club was Constance "Connie" Leathart, a young socialite who, despite crashing on her first solo flight, 24 February 1926, went on to become an accomplished pilot. With her great friend, Walter Leslie Runciman, 2nd Viscount Runciman of Doxford, they formed Cramlington Aircraft Ltd, and took over the aircraft and business of Pleasure Flying Services on 30 October 1929. The company managed the aerodrome and ran a maintenance and repair operation. It also built gliders from scratch including a Zögling type designed by Mr Alec Bell, and in 1930 designed and built three examples of the Cramlington Cramcraft primary glider.

A president of the Newcastle Aero Club,  Sam Smith, was the founder of Ringtons Tea. In 1931 he was a founder member of Newcastle Gliding Club at Cramlington, which mainly used winch-launching for take-offs. The club's president was Walter Leslie Runciman, and they used a Cramlington Cramcraft as a basic trainer.

Scheduled services
George Nicholson started an experimental service, trading as "Northern Airways", from his base at Cramlington to the Isle of Man (Hall Caine Airport) via Carlisle (Kingstown Municipal Airport) in his De Havilland DH.84 Dragon G-ACFG, running from 1 August 1934 to 30 September. He went on to start Northern & Scottish Airways in Glasgow later that year.

In April 1935 North Eastern Airways started a service to link Edinburgh (Turnhouse) with London (Heston Airport) via Newcastle (Cramlington) and Leeds (Yeadon). The Edinburgh leg was delayed until 27 May. There was little demand, and the service stopped on 27 June.

Events

The Newcastle Aero Club held its opening ceremony on 26 November 1925, at which its first two Moths were named. It organised its first Annual Flying Meeting on 4 September 1926 in which the Fleet Air Arm took part, with 406 Flight sending a large number of Fairey Flycatchers.

On 7 July 1929, Alan Cobham visited Cramlington on his Municipal Aerodrome Campaign. He judged that the airfield at Newcastle's Town Moor, from which he had operated the previous day, was too rough and dangerous for his de Havilland DH.61 Giant Moth (registered G-AEEV and named Youth of Britain) and had relocated to Cramlington. The engine cut out and he landed, demolishing a tent and running into a wire fence, tearing off a wing, and stopping a few yards from the clubhouse. No one was harmed, and the aircraft was quickly repaired.

On 5 October 1929 three significant air races were held during an Air Pageant; the Air League Challenge Cup, the Grosvenor Challenge Cup, and the SBAC Challenge Cup. They were all won by members of the Newcastle Aero Club in its DH.60 Moth G-EBPT.

The King's Cup Air Race took place on 5 July 1930, and Cramlington was the third of four stops on the circular route which started and finished in Hanworth Air Park in London. With 88 starters, this was to be the largest field in the history of the race, and the 71 aircraft which survived as far as Cramlington all arrived in the space of just over an hour, causing considerable chaos but only two minor accidents.

On 31 August 1930 an Air Fete was held which included a race. The Grosvenor Challenge Cup race was held again on 22 August 1931.

A London to Newcastle Air Race was instituted by the Aero Club, flying from Heston to Cramlington on 30 May 1931. It was repeated, starting from Brooklands in 1932, 1933 and 1934, and the last ones were to Woolsington in 1935 and 36.

Alan Cobham's National Aviation Day "Flying Circus" displays visited Cramlington on the following dates: 2 and 3 July 1932, 1 and 2 July 1933 (No. 2 Tour), 8 September 1934 and 26 and 27 July 1935 (Astra Show).

The British Hospitals Air Pageant visited on 12 August 1933. Among the displays was the unique Miles M.1 Satyr G-ABVG and the De Havilland DH.60M Moth VH-UQA in which C. W. A. Scott made his record-breaking return flights from Australia to Britain.

Demise
Almost all of Cramlington's users and residents had moved there by May 1936 in which month Cramlington Aircraft ceased trading, and the airfield was left almost deserted. An exception was the Gliding Club, which remained until the outbreak of World War II in September 1939. Cramlington Aircraft Ltd entered voluntary liquidation in January 1939.

During World War II the airfield was unused. After the war, attempts were made to restart some aviation activity, but the airfield was soon abandoned. Little of the old aerodrome remains. The landing ground is now open grassland encroached upon by the Shotton open-cast coal mine. and the buildings area is now the Bassington Industrial Estate.

Airship station

Construction of a Royal Naval Airship Station, RNAS Cramlington, started in 1918 at Nelson Village, about half a mile (0.8 km) to the east of the existing aerodrome. It was planned that four Submarine Scout Twin (SST) airships would be based here, but construction of the large airship shed to house them was not finished until 1919. However the planned airships did operate from here for a short period, along with a complement of twenty officers and around 280 men.

The site was soon abandoned, but the huge airship shed was taken over by British Airships Ltd which later changed its name to the Airship Development Company. Here they assembled what was claimed to be Britain's first private airship, the AD.1. This had been designed principally by Reginald Foster Dagnall, who had designed previous airships and founded the RFD company. The airship was built in Guildford, Surrey, but as most airship sheds in Britain had been demolished, it was brought to Cramlington for inflation and testing.

Registered G-FAAX, its first flight was on 18 September 1929 and after several test flights was deflated for modifications. Flying again the following May, it performed its intended role in aerial advertising, with large banners attached to its sides. Business was hard to come by, however, and the airship had to travel far to get work. On a commission in Belgium for a cigarette company, it was destroyed in a storm on 5 October 1930. The remains were returned to Britain and auctioned, and the company was liquidated the next year.

The shed was little used until after World War II, but in later years was used for the production of concrete lamp posts, It survived until 1967 when it was demolished. The site is now the South Nelson Industrial Estate.

Accidents and incidents
 On 5 April RFC BE2c 1916 of 36 (HD) Sqn was sent up to intercept Zeppelin L16. It hit a building on night approach to Cramlington and its bombs exploded, killing the pilot.
 On 2 October 2016 RFC Avro 504A 7970 of 58 Sqn lost speed on a turn and dived in near Cramlington. The pilot was killed.
 On 5 January 1917 RFC Avro 504A A555 of 63 Sqn stalled and dived in during the pilot's first solo flight. The pilot was killed.
On 24 June 1926 Gnosspelius Gull No 2 (unregistered) dived in on landing, killing the pilot, the chief flying instructor at Newcastle Aero Club.
 On 22 February 1927 De Havilland DH.60 Moth G-EBLY of the Newcastle Aero Club crashed after an engine failure on take-off and was written off. Previously it had crashed on landing on 6 January 1926 and been returned to De Havilland at its base at Stag Lane, London for repair. On 26 November the same year it hit a fence on take-off and was again sent to Stag Lane, returning on 23 January 1927. All incidents happened at Cramlington and none resulted in fatalities.
 On 23 November 1928 a violent storm caused a hangar to collapse, damaging the Aero Club's Moths G-EBLX, G-EBPT and G-EBQV. They were all repaired and returned to service.
 On 1 December 1929 De Havilland DH.60 Moth G-EBPT of the Newcastle Aero Club was written off when it spun into a quarry during a landing at Cramlington, injuring the two occupants. Just a few weeks earlier it had won three prestigious air races in one day (see Events above). It had previously been damaged in the hangar collapse on 23 November 1928 and been repaired.

In media
The Aerodrome is mentioned in The Black Peril, a Biggles novel by W.E. Johns published in 1935.

Footnotes

References

Royal Air Force stations in Northumberland
Defunct airports in England
Airports established in 1915